Martin Weber may refer to:

Martin Weber (architect) (1890–1941), German architect
Martin J. Weber (1905–2007), American graphic artist
Martin Weber (ski jumper) (born 1954), East German former ski jumper
Martin Weber (footballer) (born 1957), Swiss former football player and manager
Heinrich Martin Weber (1842–1913), German mathematician
Martin Andrade Weber Chagas Carvalho (born 1985), Brazilian former football player
Martin Weber House, historical residence of Catherin and Martin Weber

See also
Weber